Mary Baird may refer to:

 Mary Baird Bryan (1861–1930), American writer and suffragette
 Mary Baird (nurse) (1907–2009), Northern Irish nurse and health service administrator